The Between the Rivers Historic District in Rome, Georgia, USA, is a  historic district which was listed on the National Register of Historic Places in 1983. The listing included 292 contributing buildings and three contributing structures.

It is a hilly area, with three sides defined by the Etowah River and the Oostanaula River.

Significant buildings in the district include:
Busy Bee Cafe Building, 224 Broad Street
Southern Bell Telephone Company Building, 400 Broad Street
Broad Street Pawn Shop Building, 412 Broad Street
Montgomery Ward and Company Building, 413-417 Broad Street
Esserman's Department Store, 425-429 Broad Street
Maxwell, Quinn, and Garnett Furniture Company, 519 Broad Street
Greystone Hotel, 10 Second Avenue
Greystone Apartment Building, 12 Second Avenue
Tribune Building, 102-104 W. Fourth Avenue
Union Bus Terminal, 107 W. Fourth Avenue
Coca-Cola Bottling Company Building, 106-108 W. Fifth Avenue

It also includes the Rome Clock Tower, a water tower with a clock, which was separately listed on the National Register in 1980.

It included two historic bridges: a 1916-1917 solid-arch concrete bridge which brings Broad Street over the Etowah River and a 1930
iron truss bridge which brings Second Avenue over the Ooostanaula River.

A boundary increase in 1989 added one contributing building, the Union Bus Terminal, and provided additional information, including that the Second Avenue bridge had been demolished, around 1983, and replaced.

References

Historic districts on the National Register of Historic Places in Georgia (U.S. state)
National Register of Historic Places in Floyd County, Georgia
Victorian architecture in Georgia (U.S. state)
Late 19th and Early 20th Century American Movements architecture